James Parsons may refer to:

James Parsons (footballer) (born 1997), Australian footballer
James Parsons (physician) (1705–1770), English physician, antiquary and author
James Parsons (rugby union) (born 1986), New Zealand rugby union footballer
James Parsons (South Carolina politician), (born 1724), 2nd vice president of South Carolina
James Parsons Building of Liverpool John Moores University
James A. Parsons (c. 1868–1945), New York State attorney general, 1914
James Benton Parsons (1911–1993), U.S. federal judge
James K. Parsons (1877–1960), U.S. Army officer
James M. Parsons, justice of the Iowa Supreme Court
James R. Parsons (c. 1830–1905), Australian educator
Dick Parsons (coach) (James R. Parsons, born 1938), retired American basketball and baseball coach
J. Graham Parsons (1907–1991), American diplomat
Jim Parsons (drag racer), American gasser drag racer
Jim Parsons (born 1973), American actor